Margaret Croft Scriven-Vivian (née Scriven; 17 August 1912 – 25 January 2001) was a British tennis player and the first woman from that country to win the singles title at the French Championships in 1933. She also won the singles title at the 1934 French Championships, defeating Helen Jacobs in the final. She was ranked No. 5 in the world in 1933 and 1934.

Early life
Margaret Scriven was born on 18 August 1912 at Chapel Allerton, Leeds. She was educated at home. Her parents were club level tennis players and she played the game from an early age, playing on holiday and entering local tournaments. According to one source, there was a tennis court at her family home and she was coached by her father, Edgar Scriven and by her mother.

Career
Scriven won the British Junior Championships held at Wimbledon in September 1929. In the final, Scriven defeated Miss P. Burt from Nottingham, 6–1, 6–3.

In June 1930, Scriven played at the Wimbledon Championships for the first time, where she was beaten in the first round by Miss K. le Messurier.

At Wimbledon in 1931, Scriven, was far more successful than at first attempt in the previous year. She reached the quarter-finals where she was beaten by the French player, Simonne Mathieu, 1–6, 6–2, 7–5.

In 1932 she won the singles title at the British Covered Court Championships, played on the wooden courts at the Queen's Club, after a victory in the final against Kay Stammers.

For the 1933 French Championships, Scriven was not selected to go with the official British touring party. Instead, she travelled to Paris independently. After beating top British players Mary Heeley and Betty Nuthall on her way to the final,  Scriven won the tournament, beating Simonne Mathieu in the final. She also triumphed in the mixed doubles, partnered by the Australian player, Jack Crawford.

In early August, 1933, Scriven was part of the losing British team in the Wightman Cup held at Forest Hills, New York.

Later in the same month, Scriven was at Forest Hills for the US Championships. In the singles, she reached the last 16 of the tournament, being knocked out by the American, Josephine Cruickshank. She also competed in the doubles and mixed doubles at the championships. Partnered by the Australian player Jack Crawford, Scriven reached the semi-finals of the mixed doubles.

In May 1934, Scriven was back at the French Championships, this time as part of the official British team. On 3 June 1934, Scriven retained her French title, beating Helen Jacobs of America, 7–5, 4–6, 6–1. The final started at the late time of 6.30pm and, after two sets had been played, both players appealed against the light. The appeal was turned down, however, and the match continued in twilight. After 3 more games, with Scriven leading 2–1, Jacobs appealed again against the light but was turned down. Scriven went on to win all the remaining games.

At the French Championships in 1935, Scriven was unable to win the singles for the third time, being beaten in the semi-finals. However, she did win the doubles, partnered by Katherine Stammers.

Scriven-Vivian was the last British woman to win the same Grand Slam singles tournament for two consecutive years. In addition, she was the first left-handed woman to win a Grand Slam singles title and was the only unseeded woman ever to win the French Championships or French Open until the 2017 singles title was won by Jeļena Ostapenko.		

She played for the British Wightman Cup team in 1933, 1934 and 1938.

According to A. Wallis Myers of The Daily Telegraph and the Daily Mail, Scriven-Vivian was ranked in the world top ten from 1933 through 1935, reaching a career high of World No. 5 in those rankings in 1933 and 1934.

Personal life
Scriven married Harvey Vivian on 28 November 1940 who was a house master and a wartime RAF officer. The couple had a son and a daughter.

Grand Slam finals

Singles (2 titles)

Doubles (1 title)

Mixed doubles (1 title)

Grand Slam singles tournament timeline

R = tournament restricted to French nationals and held under German occupation.

1In 1946 and 1947, the French Championships were held after Wimbledon.

See also 
 Performance timelines for all female tennis players who reached at least one Grand Slam final

References

External links
 National Portrait Gallery image

English female tennis players
French Championships (tennis) champions
Sportspeople from Leeds
1912 births
2001 deaths
Grand Slam (tennis) champions in women's singles
Grand Slam (tennis) champions in women's doubles
Grand Slam (tennis) champions in mixed doubles
International Tennis Hall of Fame inductees
British female tennis players
Tennis people from West Yorkshire